Sokolovac is a village in the municipality Dežanovac, Bjelovar-Bilogora County in Croatia. According to the 2001 census, there are 255 inhabitants, in 85 family households.

References 

Populated places in Bjelovar-Bilogora County